Dean Anton Williams (born 14 November 1970) is an English retired professional footballer who played as a forward in the Football League for Brentford, Cambridge United and Doncaster Rovers. Williams found his level in non-League football and scored over 145 goals in over 285 games, most notably for St Albans City, Wokingham Town, Aylesbury United and Berkhamsted Town, whom he player-managed.

Honours 
St Albans City
 East Anglian Cup: 1992–93
Aylesbury United
 Isthmian League Cup: 1994–95

Career statistics

References

1970 births
Association football forwards
Aylesbury United F.C. players
Berkhamsted Town F.C. managers
Berkhamsted Town F.C. players
Brentford F.C. players
Cambridge United F.C. players
Chesham United F.C. players
Doncaster Rovers F.C. players
English footballers
Footballers from Hertfordshire
Sportspeople from Hemel Hempstead
Hayes F.C. players
Hemel Hempstead Town F.C. players
Hitchin Town F.C. players
Isthmian League players
Living people
St Albans City F.C. players
Stevenage F.C. players
English Football League players
Wokingham Town F.C. players
English football managers